Climate of Hunter is the eleventh studio album by the American solo artist Scott Walker. It was released in March 1984 and reached number 60 on the UK Albums Chart. It includes the single "Track Three". It was his only album of the 1980s.

The album was a comeback of sorts for Walker, following a decade and a half of commercial decline and artistic frustration, and coming off the heels of a renewed interest in his 1960s work from the UK post-punk and indie scene. Walker wrote the songs for the album between August and September 1983, and it was recorded between October and December 1983 in the UK at The Town House, EMI and Sarm West Studios. The album was released as an LP in March 1984, receiving positive reviews. It was released on CD in the mid-1980s, and reissued on CD in January 2006, with revised artwork and having been remastered. The original artwork for the album was designed by C.More.Tone, with photography by Bob Carlos Clarke.

Background
Following the poor reception of Walker's tenth solo album, 1974's We Had It All, Walker reformed The Walker Brothers and signed to GTO Records. The reunited group recorded three albums together, 1975's No Regrets, 1976's Lines and 1978's Nite Flights. No Regrets and Lines had continued the musical vein of middle-of-the-road cover versions that Walker had followed on his previous two solo albums. The title track, "No Regrets", had become a hit single in early 1976, but critically and commercially both albums were unsuccessful.

The group began recording Nite Flights knowing that GTO was soon to collapse. The decision was made to produce an album of their own compositions without compromise. The resulting album emphasised an art rock and disco sound utilising harder drum sounds, synthesizers and electric guitars. The three group members each wrote and sang their own compositions. Scott's four songs – "Shut Out", "Fat Mama Kick", "Nite Flights" and "The Electrician" – were his first original compositions since 1970's 'Til the Band Comes In. Walker's songwriting displayed remarkable growth from his 1960s work and had more in common with the music of David Bowie, Brian Eno and Lou Reed. The extremely dark and discomforting sound of Scott's songs, particularly "The Electrician", was to prove a forerunner to the direction of his future solo work.

Nite Flights was released in 1978 to poor sales figures but warm critical opinion, especially Scott's contributions. In the period after the album Walker was without a record deal, and remarked in an interview with the journalist Alan Bangs that he had lived on "not a lot" between Nite Flights and Climate of Hunter. Walker compared himself to Orson Welles, a great man everyone wants to meet, but for whom nobody will finance their next project. Out of his now good critical standing a trio of compilations was released in the early 1980s and a long-term deal with Virgin Records was made. Ardent fan Julian Cope assembled a collection of Walker originals titled Fire Escape in the Sky: The Godlike Genius of Scott Walker in 1981, quickly followed by Scott Walker Sings Jacques Brel and The Best of Scott Walker. In spite of signing a new deal, Walker was slow to begin writing his first album for the label.

Recording and music
Although Walker was slow to begin writing, the seven songs composed for the album were completed and recorded quickly in the last six months of 1983. The album was produced with Peter Walsh who had recently worked with Simple Minds on their break-through album, 1982's New Gold Dream (81–82–83–84). Together with Walsh, Walker assembled a band of seasoned session players such as free-improvising saxophone player Evan Parker, Dire Straits' Mark Knopfler on guitar and the R&B singer Billy Ocean.

Discussing the recording of the album for the documentary Scott Walker: 30 Century Man (2006), Walsh explained that the musicians were expected to record their parts without knowing the melody to any of the songs, in part because Walker had not recorded any demos and also because the melody was "a closely guarded secret". Walker explained that if the melody was known it would take the song away from the "concentrated place" he intended. The intention was to "keep everything a little disjointed" so there is "no chance of everyone swinging together".

The resulting songs are driven by and founded on Peter Van Hooke's drums, Mo Foster's bass and Walker's vocals. Guitars, synthesizers, brass and strings are each used sparingly with abstract results. An orchestra is prominent on "Rawhide" and is the lone accompaniment on "Sleepwalkers Woman", while guitars come to the fore on "Track Three", "Track Seven" and "Blanket Roll Blues".

Walker made the unusual choice of giving half of the tracks on Climate of Hunter numerical titles. He explained in a TV interview on music programme The Tube that the songs were complete and that titles might "lopside" or "overload" them, presumably giving undue weight to one line of the lyric over the others. The songs have since been attributed the informal titles "Delayed" ("Track Three"), "It's a Starving" ("Track Five"), "Say It" ("Track Six"), and "Stump of a Drowner" ("Track Seven"), because the lyrics sheet bolds each of those starting lines instead of denoting the songs by their "Track" titles.

The last track on the album, "Blanket Roll Blues", is the only song written by Tennessee Williams, providing lyrics for the song originally featured in the 1959 film The Fugitive Kind sung by Marlon Brando.

Releases
Climate of Hunter was first released in March 1984 as an LP in the UK by Virgin Records. The album was re-released on LP and CD as part of Virgin Records 'compact price' range in the mid-1980s. A remastered edition of the album was released in the UK by Virgin and EMI on January 30, 2006. It included revised artwork and new liner notes by Bob Stanley of Saint Etienne.

Reception

Climate of Hunter received mixed to positive reviews by the majority of critics. It was ranked number 5 among the "Albums of the Year" for 1984 by NME.

Track listing
All tracks composed by Scott Walker, August–September 1983, except "Blanket Roll Blues" (words by Tennessee Williams, music by Kenyon Hopkins). Orchestral arrangements by Brian Gascoigne.

Personnel
 Mo Foster – bass (except tracks 4 & 8)
 Brian Gascoigne – keyboards (on tracks 2, 3 & 5)
 Peter Van Hooke – drums (except tracks 4 & 8)
 Mark Isham – trumpet (on tracks 2 & 3)
 Gary Kettel – percussion (on tracks 5 & 7)
 Billy Ocean – harmony vocal (on track 3)
 Phil Palmer – lead & background guitars (on track 3)
 Evan Parker – tenor & soprano saxophone (on tracks 2 & 6)
 Ray Russell – lead & background guitars (on tracks 3 & 7)
 Mark Knopfler – guitars (on track 8)
Technical
 Bob Carlos Clarke – photography
 c•more•tone – sleeve design

Release history

Charts

External links
 
 The Town House, EMI
 Sarm West Studios

References

Scott Walker (singer) albums
1984 albums
Virgin Records albums
Albums produced by Peter Walsh